Hawkesworth is a surname. Notable people with the surname include:

 Bob Hawkesworth (born 1951), Canadian politician
 John Hawkesworth (book editor) (c. 1715–1773), English writer and book editor
 John Hawkesworth (Army general) (1893–1945), British Army Lieutenant-General
 John Hawkesworth (producer) (1920–2003), English television producer and script writer
 M. Maurice Hawkesworth (born 1960), American songwriter and producer
 William de Hawkesworth (died 1349), English medieval college head and university chancellor

See also
 Hawksworth (disambiguation)